Parasphaerichthys is a genus of gouramies known only from streams and freshwater pools in the Irrawaddy basin of Myanmar.

Species
There are currently two recognized species in this genus:

 Parasphaerichthys lineatus Britz & Kottelat, 2002
 Parasphaerichthys ocellatus Prashad & Mukerji, 1929 (Eyespot gourami)

References

Luciocephalinae

Freshwater fish genera